Lake Louise station is a railway station in Lake Louise, Alberta, Canada. Historically served by the Canadian Pacific Railway (CPR) and Via Rail, it is now a stop for the Rocky Mountaineer and houses a restaurant. The station is on the CPR main line near Lower Lake Louise, downhill from the Chateau Lake Louise.

The station was originally built for the CPR. The station was declared a heritage railway station by the federal government in 1991. Starting in 1909, it was the first of  six mountain stations built by the Canadian Pacific in a rustic log building design, consistent with how the railway marketed the region as a wilderness tourist destination.

The older depot that the 1910 building replaced continued to be used by the CPR for other purposes. The CPR donated it in 1976 to Heritage Park Historical Village in Calgary. The depot was moved to the park and restored to the era when the Lake Louise village was called Laggan.

References

External links
Lake Louise Station

Designated Heritage Railway Stations in Alberta
Canadian Pacific Railway stations in Alberta
Rocky Mountaineer stations in Alberta
Buildings and structures in Banff National Park
Railway stations in Canada opened in 1910
1910 establishments in Alberta